Ingrandes-Le Fresne sur Loire is a commune in the Maine-et-Loire department of western France. The municipality was established on 1 January 2016 and consists of the former communes of Ingrandes and Le Fresne-sur-Loire (previously part of the Loire-Atlantique department).

See also 
Communes of the Maine-et-Loire department

References 

Communes of Maine-et-Loire
States and territories established in 2016
Populated places established in 2016